The GDR championship women's basketball is the former highest women's professional club basketball competition in East Germany.

History

Champions

List of champions

External links
 Profile at Sport-komplett.de

 

East Germany
Basketball in East Germany
Sports leagues established in 1954
Women's basketball competitions in Germany